The Yale School of Medicine is the graduate medical school at Yale University, a private research university in New Haven, Connecticut. It was founded in 1810 as the Medical Institution of Yale College and formally opened in 1813.

The primary teaching hospital for the school is Yale New Haven Hospital. The school is home to the Harvey Cushing/John Hay Whitney Medical Library, one of the largest modern medical libraries which is known for its historical collections. The faculty includes 70 National Academy of Sciences members, 47 National Academy of Medicine members, and 13 Howard Hughes Medical Institute investigators.

U.S. News & World Report currently ranks the Yale School of Medicine 10th in the country for research and 59th in primary care. The MD program is highly selective; for the class of 2022, the school received 4,968 applications to fill 104 seats. The median GPA for the class was 3.89, and the median MCAT was 521.

Education

The School of Medicine offers the Doctor of Medicine (MD) degree and a Master of Medical Science (MMSc) degree through the Yale Physician Associate Program and  Yale Physician Assistant Online Program for prospective physician assistants. Public health degrees are administered through the Yale School of Public Health.

There are also joint degree programs with other disciplines at Yale, including the MD/Juris Doctor (J.D.) in conjunction with Yale Law School; the MD/Master of Business Administration (MBA) in conjunction with the Yale School of Management; the MD/Master of Public Health (MPH) in conjunction with the Yale School of Public Health; science or engineering in conjunction with the Yale Graduate School of Arts and Sciences (MD/PhD); and the MD/Master of Divinity (MDiv) in conjunction with Yale Divinity School. Students pursuing a tuition-free fifth year of research are eligible for the Master of Health Science degree.

The school employs the "Yale System" established by Dean Winternitz in the 1920s, wherein first- and second-year students are not graded or ranked among their classmates. In addition, course examinations are anonymous and are intended only for students' self-evaluation. Student performance is thus based on seminar participation, qualifying examinations (if a student fails, it is his or her responsibility to meet with a professor and arrange for an alternative assessment - passing grades are not released), clinical clerkship evaluations, and the United States Medical Licensing Examination (USMLE). Prior to graduation, students are required to submit a thesis based on original research.

History

In 18th century United States, credentials were not needed to practice medicine. Prior to the founding of the medical school, Yale graduates would train through an apprenticeship in order to become physicians. Yale President Ezra Stiles conceived the idea of training physicians at Yale and ultimately, his successor Timothy Dwight IV helped found the medical school.  The school was chartered in 1810 and opened in New Haven in 1813. Nathan Smith (medicine and surgery) and Benjamin Silliman (pharmacology) were the first faculty members. Silliman was a professor of chemistry and taught at both Yale College and the Medical School. The other two founding faculty were Jonathan Knight, anatomy, physiology and surgery and Eli Ives, pediatrics.

One of Yale's earliest medical graduates was Dr. Asaph Leavitt Bissell of Hanover, New Hampshire, who graduated in 1815, a member of the school's second graduating class. Following his graduation, Dr. Bissell moved to Suffield, Connecticut, a tobacco-farming community where his parents came from, and where he practiced as a country physician for the rest of his life. The saddlebags that Dr. Bissell carried in his practice, packed with paper packets and glass bottles, are today in the school's Medical Historical Library.

The original building (at Grove and Prospect) later became Sheffield Hall, part of the Sheffield Scientific School (razed in 1931).  In 1860, the school moved to Medical Hall on York Street, near Chapel (this building was razed in 1957). In 1925, the school moved to its current campus, neighboring the hospital.  This campus includes the Sterling Hall of Medicine, Boyer Center for Molecular Medicine (1991, designed by Cesar Pelli), Anlyan Center (2003, designed by Payette and Venturi Scott Brown) and the Amistad Building (2007, designed by Herbert Newman).

On March 28, 2022, a former administrator pled guilty to fraud and tax charges for the theft of over $40 million dollars of computer and electronic software. Jamie Petrone-Codrington illegally bought and sold hardware purchased for the School of Medicine, starting in 2013. According to the court records, Petrone-Codrington was turned in by an anonymous tip after being seen loading computer equipment into her private vehicle after ordering suspiciously high volumes of equipment.

Deans
Before 1845, there was no dean.  Nathan Smith, followed by Jonathan Knight, provided leadership in the early years.
 Charles Hooker (1845–1863): Professor of Anatomy and Physiology
 Charles Augustus Lindsley (1863–1885): Professor of Materia Medica and Therapeutics, later the Professor of the Theory and Practice of Medicine
 Herbert Eugene Smith (1885–1910): physician and chemist
 George Blumer (1910–1920)
 Milton Winternitz (1920–1935): pathologist
 Stanhope Bayne-Jones (1935–1940): physician and bacteriologist
 Francis Gilman Blake (1940–1947)
 Cyril Norman Hugh Long (1947–1952): physician and biochemist
 Vernon W. Lippard (1952–1967)
 Frederick Carl Redlich (1967–1972): psychiatrist
 Lewis Thomas (1972–1973): physician and author
 Robert Berliner (1973–1984)
 Leon Rosenberg (1984–1991)
 Robert M. Donaldson (acting) (1991–1992)
 Gerard N. Burrow (1992–1997)
 David Aaron Kessler (1997–2003): pediatrician, lawyer and former commissioner of the Food and Drug Administration
 Dennis Spencer (acting) (2003–2004): neurosurgeon
 Robert Alpern (2004–2020): nephrologist
 Nancy J. Brown (2020–present)

Notable faculty

Current
 Gretchen Berland: physician and filmmaker
 Hilary Blumberg (2015–): Furth Professor of Psychiatric Neuroscience
 Arthur L. Horwich (1984–): Sterling Professor of Genetics and Pediatrics, uncovered the action of chaperonins in his study of protein folding
 Marcella Nunez-Smith: Co-chair of the Biden-Harris Transition COVID-19 Task Force
 Onyema Ogbuagu: associate professor, director of the Yale AIDS Program clinical trials unit
 James Rothman (2008–): Fergus F. Wallace Professor of Biomedical Sciences, Chairman of the Department of Cell Biology, winner of the 2013 Nobel Prize in Physiology or Medicine
 Lisa Sanders: The New York Times Diagnosis columnist, technical advisor for TV show House, M.D.
 Joan Steitz (1970–): Sterling Professor of Biophysics and Biochemistry

Past
 C. Lee Buxton (1953–1965): obstetrician, birth control advocate and appellant in Griswold v. Connecticut
 Harvey Cushing (1933–1937): neurosurgeon, pioneer of brain surgery, identified Cushing's syndrome
 Russell Henry Chittenden (1900–1922): physiological chemist, pioneer of digestion and nutrition
 James William Colbert Jr., (1950–1953): immunologist, Assistant Dean of Postgraduate Education, and father of comedian Stephen Colbert
 Marilyn Farquhar (1973–1990): cell biologist, first woman Sterling Professor at Yale
 Stephen Fleck (1912–2002): psychiatrist, coauthor of Schizophrenia and the Family
 John Farquhar Fulton (1929–1960): Sterling Professor of Physiology, neurophysiology of primates
 Patricia Goldman-Rakic (1979–2003): neurobiologist, pioneer of studies on the frontal lobe and the cellular basis of working memory
 Arnold Gesell (1911–1949): psychologist and pediatrician, developed the Yale Child Study Center
 Alfred Gilman Sr. (1935–1943, 1973–1984): pharmacologist, chemotherapy pioneer and co-author of The Pharmacological Basis of Therapeutics 
 Harry S.N. Greene (1943–1969): professor of pathology
 Dorothy Horstmann: epidemiologist, virologist, pioneer in the study of polio and the first woman appointed as a professor at the school
 Orvan Hess: developed the fetal heart monitor and early use of penicillin
 James D. Jamieson (1973–2018): cell biologist, established the function of the Golgi apparatus alongside George Palade
 Theodore Lidz (1951–1978): Sterling Professor of Psychiatry, researcher of schizophrenia
 Lafayette Mendel (1921–1935): biochemist, discoverer of Vitamin A, Vitamin B and essential amino acids
 Sherwin B. Nuland: winner of the National Book Award for How We Die: Reflections on Life's Final Chapter
 George Emil Palade (1973–1983): cell biologist, Sterling Professor of Cell Biology, 1974 Nobel Prize in Physiology and Medicine
 William Prusoff: discovered idoxuridine, the first antiviral agent approved by the U.S. Food and Drug Administration, and discovered the anti-HIV effect of stavudine (D4T)
 Juan Rosai (1985–1991): professor of pathology and Director of the Department of Anatomic Pathology, author of surgical pathology textbook, discoverer of Rosai-Dorfman disease and desmoplastic small round cell tumor
 Richard Selzer (1960–1985): surgeon and author
 Albert J. Solnit (1952–1990): psychoanalyst, child rights advocate, and Sterling Professor
 Nathan Smith: founder of Dartmouth Medical School and the University of Vermont College of Medicine
 Thomas A. Steitz (1970–2018): Sterling Professor of Biophysics and Biochemistry, 2009 Nobel Prize in Chemistry, discovered the atomic structure of the ribosome
 Richard W. Tsien (1945–): physiologist, characterized calcium channel types
 Frans Wackers (1977–1981, 1984–): nuclear cardiologist
 Brian Kobilka (1977–1981): physiologist, recipient of the 2012 Nobel Prize in Chemistry

See also
 List of Yale University people
 List of Ivy League medical schools

References

External links
 Official site
 Medicine at Yale 1701-1901
 Medicine at Yale 1901-1951
 Medicine at Yale 1951-2001
 Institute of Medicine member list

 
Medicine
Educational institutions established in 1810
Medical schools in Connecticut
Universities and colleges in New Haven County, Connecticut
Ivy League medical schools